Rea Ann Silva (born 1961) is the creator of the Beauty blender makeup application sponge and the founder and CEO of the Beauty blender company. Silva created the sponge while working as a make-up artist for the Girlfriends television series. In 2019, her company's sales were expected to reach $215 million.

Early life and education 
Raised in Los Angeles, California, Silva attended the Fashion Institute of Design and Merchandising in Los Angeles

Career 
Silva has years of experience working as a makeup artist for artists such as Dr. Dre, Eve, Tupac, and Brandy during her tenure at  MTV(Source 1) and years of experience working with entertainers such as Regina King, Kerry Washington, and Macy Gray, according to the National Museum of History. According to IMDB Silva also worked on sets for movies such as “Friday” (1995), “Money Talks”(1997), and “Idle Hands”(1999) in addition to  T.V shows like  “Girlfriends” and “Moesha” prior to her creation of the Beauty blender.

Creation of the Beauty Blender 
According to MSBC, the beauty blender was created as a tool to avoid the hassle of having to use an airbrush, which required actors to be pulled offset, to apply foundation on set. Because of the sponge's convenience Silva was able to create a simple prototype of the sponge and later able to capitalize on the product in 2002 and create a product that would go on to win her multiple awards as well as elevate her company to the top of the beauty industry.

Personal life 
Silva has one daughter with the ex-Rams running back, Eric Dickerson, and a son named Cruz Nix with her husband Rory Nix.

Silva identifies as Latina coming from Mexican, Spanish, and Native American on her Mother’s Side and Portuguese and Irish background on her father’s side.

References 

21st-century American businesspeople
21st-century American businesswomen
1961 births
Living people
American make-up artists